Allaman Castle is a castle in the municipality of Allaman in the canton of Vaud in Switzerland. It has its origins in the 11/12th Century but the main components were built by Louis, Duke of Savoy - Count de Vaud, in 1253. It is listed in the Swiss Inventory of Cultural Property of National and Regional Significance.

The wealthy Genevan philanthropist Count Jean-Jacques de Sellon, (son of Hortense Gallatin, the sister of Albert Gallatin) who owned the property until 1839, gave accommodation at the castle to, amongst many others, such political refugees as Napoleon's brother Joseph Bonaparte, Empress Joséphine de Beauharnais, the Duke of Bassano, the Count Camille Cavour, Voltaire as well as to Franz Liszt and George Sand. In 1820 de Sellon founded the Society of Peace, forerunner of the League of Nations and the United Nations Organization (UNO) and in 1830 the First International Peace Summit was held in Château d'Allaman. Since then, the Castle has also been referred to "The Castle of Peace". 
De Sellon was also instrumental in the abolition of the death penalty in Switzerland.

The Castle of Allaman is one of the largest private properties of Switzerland. The estate is surrounded by private forests, parks, gardens and Grand Cru vine yards. Recently completely restored and transformed, the Castle is owned by a Swiss family.

See also
 List of castles and fortresses in Switzerland

References

External links

 Château d'Allaman (homepage)
 Allaman 200 years peace UN Report.jpg|200 years of Peace U.N. Report
 François Diday Painting of Château_d_Allaman(d) 19th Century
 Grand Cru Wines of Chateau Allaman (homepage)

Castles in Vaud
Cultural property of national significance in the canton of Vaud